Fah-fah is a Djiboutian soup, Mostly eaten in southern parts of the country. It is mainly served for Dinner. This dish is really popular in East African cuisine. Fah-fah is made typically of goat meat with vegetables and green chilies and served with flatbread called Aish or also known as Lebanese bread or it is served with Injera, a popular Ethiopian bread or Lahoh, a sponge-like Somali bread.

This should not be confused with dried infant formula called faffa in neighboring Ethiopia.

See also
 List of African dishes

References
https://www.greatbritishchefs.com/features/east-african-food-guide

Ethiopian cuisine
Somali cuisine
Djiboutian cuisine